Laura Suarez (1909–1990) was a Brazilian singer and film actress. She appeared in twelve films including Samba in Berlin (1944), but much of her work involved performing on the radio or in nightclubs.

Selected filmography
 Samba in Berlin (1944)
 Carnival of Crime (1962)

References

Bibliography 
 Flórido, Eduardo Giffoni. Great characters in the history of Brazilian cinema. Fraiha, 1999.

External links 
 

1909 births
1990 deaths
Brazilian film actresses
Musicians from Rio de Janeiro (city)
20th-century Brazilian actresses
20th-century Brazilian women singers
20th-century Brazilian singers